Köhlbrand is an anabranch of the Unterelbe river in the Port of Hamburg, Germany.

History

The branch emerged during floods in the 14th and 15th centuries, which separated the former Elbe island of Gorieswerder.

The Köhlbrand is bridged by the Köhlbrand Bridge, both probably named after charcoal burners (Köhler), whose fires (Brand) could be seen along the river banks and who sold coal to the boatmen. Until the 19th century dockyards were located at the banks of Köhlbrand. Its former pathway is marked by the harbour basin of Kohlenschiffhafen, which is almost completely filled up with sand today.

Nowadays, the complete Süderelbe waterflow is redirected through the Köhlbrand, which is a main access to the Container Terminal Altenwerder.

See also
List of rivers of Hamburg

References

External links 

Image gallery

Rivers of Hamburg
Federal waterways in Germany
0Kohlbrand
Rivers of Germany